The Second Government of the Republic of Croatia was the Croatian Government cabinet led by Prime Minister Josip Manolić. It was announced on 24 August 1990, when the previous prime minister, Stjepan Mesić, left Zagreb to assume the Croatian seat at the Yugoslav collective presidency following armed insurrection by ethnic Serbs. During the cabinet's duration Croatia declared its independence from Yugoslavia on 25 June 1991. It was the 2nd cabinet of modern Croatia since the first multi-party elections, formed by the Croatian Democratic Union, and was reconstructed on 17 July 1991 in favor of a national unity government in response to the escalation of the Croatian War of Independence.

List of ministers and portfolios
The periods in the table fall outside the cabinet's term when the minister listed served in the preceding or the subsequent cabinets.

References

External links
Official website of the Croatian Government

Manolic, Josip
1990 establishments in Croatia
1991 disestablishments in Croatia
Cabinets established in 1990
Cabinets disestablished in 1991